Tubulocystic renal cell carcinoma is rare subtype of renal cell carcinoma.

References 

Kidney cancer